Singleton railway station served the village of Singleton in the county of West Sussex in England. The station was on the former line between Chichester and Midhurst. It was opened on 11 July 1881.

The station, designed by T. H. Myres, was built in a grand way by its owners the London Brighton and South Coast Railway, which included four platforms, with a subway linking them and the 'Country House' style station building, buffets, long sidings for awaiting trains, a large goods shed for dealing with freight, and two signal boxes to control the station. The main reason for this large building was to deal with visitors to the Goodwood Racecourse, but passengers preferred to use Chichester Station mostly due to the walk uphill to the course from Singleton. It was one of the most visited stations by the LBSCR royal train as the Prince of Wales (later Edward VII) used to 'weekend' with the James family at West Dean House. Little other traffic was ever found, and despite all of the grand hopes, passenger services were withdrawn on 6 July 1935. Freight services remained until these were withdrawn on 28 August 1953 by British Railways. The station was later in use by a vineyard owner, but is now a private residence.

In March 2019, the former station was listed Grade II by Historic England.

References

Disused railway stations in West Sussex
Railway stations in Great Britain opened in 1881
Railway stations in Great Britain closed in 1935
Former London, Brighton and South Coast Railway stations
Thomas Myres buildings
1881 establishments in England
Grade II listed buildings in West Sussex